The Central Intelligence Organisation (CIO) is the national intelligence agency of Zimbabwe. It was conceived as the external intelligence-gathering arm of the British South Africa Police Special Branch in the early 1960s, under the Southern Rhodesian Prime Minister, Winston Field.

History

The CIO was formed in Rhodesia on the instructions of Prime Minister Winston Field in 1963, at the dissolution of the Federation of Rhodesia and Nyasaland, and took over from the Federal Intelligence and Security Bureau, which was a coordinating bureau analyzing intelligence gathered by the British South Africa Police (BSAP) and the police forces of Northern Rhodesia and Nyasaland.

The first head of the CIO was police Deputy Commissioner, Ken Flower, who, during his tenure, oversaw the BSAP's Special Branch headquarters incorporated within the CIO, while the Special Branch retained its internal security function within the BSAP upon gaining independence in April 1980.

Prime Minister Robert Mugabe kept Flower in the role of head of the CIO after majority rule in 1980, when the country's name changed to Zimbabwe. Flower had no more than a professional relationship with MI6, despite rumors that he had covertly and intermittently plotted with the British intelligence services to undermine Ian Smith's government. He had, however, an especially good professional relationship with Dick Franks, the head of MI6 at the time, as he had with all the other main intelligence agencies.

Before the March 2002 election, the Movement for Democratic Change (MDC) reportedly complained that its leaders were being "constantly harassed, intimidated and detained by the CIO and the police". The Star quotes the Zimbabwe Financial Gazette as alleging that "CIO agents from the counter-intelligence unit were working with Foreign Affairs Ministry officials to monitor the activities and movements of the international observers ahead of the critical two-day poll".

In March 2002, CIO agents reportedly arrested a Zimbabwean correspondent for London's The Daily Telegraph, Peta Thornycroft, who had gone to Chimanimani (about 480 kilometers east of Harare) to investigate election violence by the ruling party, the Zimbabwe African National Union (ZANU), against the political opposition. Under the "new state security laws," she was expected "to face charges of incitement to violence and publishing of 'false statements likely to be prejudicial to state security'". Parliament reportedly passed "the public order and security bill by acclamation and not by formal vote" in January 2002. These laws reportedly gave "sweeping powers to clamp down on the opposition". Thornycroft was reportedly released by the police "on a High Court order after four nights in detention". An Amnesty International press release of 12 March 2002 condemned the CIO for harassing and detaining Zimbabwe Election Support Network supporters.

In recent years, international human rights organizations such as Amnesty International have criticized the CIO's role in alleged internal repression, which is said on occasions to have involved torture.

Structure
Isaac Moyo is the Director General of the CIO. Aaron Nhepera served as Deputy Director until his reassignment to different duties in 2019. The CIO consists of nine key branches which include internal, external, counter-intelligence, military intelligence, close security, technical and administration. A ninth branch is known simply as branch six. Directors who report directly to Nhepera head these other branches. Immediately under the directors are deputy directors, assistant directors, provincial intelligence officers, divisional intelligence officers, senior intelligence officers, assistant senior intelligence officers, intelligence officers, senior security officers, security officers, senior security assistants and security assistants.

Functions
The function of the organization is to provide high level security to the state from threats both within and outside Zimbabwe. The organization also offers high level security to high ranking government officials like the President, various government employees like ministers and diplomats working in and outside Zimbabwe. Regionally, the organization works with other intelligence organizations from other African countries under a body called the Central Intelligence and Security Services of Africa (CISSA) to tackle problems that threaten the stability of the continent and hamper development, such as terrorism and extremism.
The CIO has largely been viewed as the real power behind the ruling party' Zanu (PF), despite  claims alleging the national army (ZNA) of being the same. Reports suggest that in the aftermath of the army deployment during the 2017 coup d'tat, the CIO, together with the Airforce of Zimbabwe and Zimbabwe Republic Police (ZRP) had mobilized a counter force to thwart the rebellious army, but were ordered to stand down by the then President Robert Mugabe to avoid the country spilling into full blown civil war.

Recruitment
The application process for a job in the organisation is not public information as in other branches of the Zimbabwe security sector like the police or the army. It would appear that they recruit people with preexisting ties, and some have even proposed that recruitment is a long vetting process to verify their suitability for the job. There have been reports linking the organization with Midlands State University. These reports asserted that the organization was targeting university graduates for their recruitment sessions. The region of Matabeleland is also one of the areas in which the recruitment sessions are alleged to have taken place in recent years.

References

1963 establishments in Southern Rhodesia
Counterintelligence agencies
Zimbabwean intelligence agencies
Law enforcement in Rhodesia
Law enforcement agencies of Zimbabwe
Military of Rhodesia
National security institutions
Government agencies established in 1963
Secret police